The 2014 Torneo del Inca (also known as part of the 2014 Copa Movistar for sponsorship reasons) was the 2nd season of the Peruvian domestic cup. A total of 16 teams were competing in the tournament from the 2014 Torneo Descentralizado.  The Torneo del Inca began on February 14 and is ended on May 21.

Competition modus
The teams will be divided in two groups of eight from which the first place teams in each respective group will qualify for a play-off game to decide the champion. The champion will classified to the 2015 Copa Libertadores as Peru 3 and the runner-up will classified to the 2015 Copa Sudamericana as Peru 4 as long as they finish in the top eight of the 2014 Torneo Descentralizado season aggregate table. Alianza Lima and Universitario were seeded into groups A and B respectively and the remaining 14 teams were drawn randomly. The venue for the final (also known as Play-off) will be chosen by the ADFP, which is the governing body of professional football in Perú, to be played on neutral ground. The team with the fewest points over all will start the 2014 Torneo Descentralizado with −3 points.

Teams

Personnel and kits

Note: Flags indicate national team as has been defined under FIFA eligibility rules. Players may hold more than one non-FIFA nationality.

Managerial changes

Group stage

Group A

Group B

Final

Top goalscorers

See also
2014 Torneo Descentralizado
2014 Torneo de Promoción y Reserva

References

External links 

  
Tournament regulations 
Tournament fixture 
Torneo Descentralizado news at Peru.com 
Torneo Descentralizado news at Dechalaca.com 

2014 domestic association football cups
2014 in Peruvian football leagues